Rob Hope may refer to:

Rob Hope (runner) (born 1974), British runner
Rob Hope (singer) (born ?), Frontman of Irish band Senakah

See also

Robert Hope (disambiguation)